Following is a list of Italian architects.

Early architects 

Marcus Agrippa
Vitruvius

Medieval architects 

Arnolfo di Cambio
Pietro Baseggio
Giotto di Bondone
Arnolfo di Cambio
Jacopo Celega
Andrea Orcagna
Andrea Pisano
Giovanni Pisano

Renaissance architects 

Aloisio da Milano
Aloisio the New
Baccio D'Agnolo
Giovanni Battista Aleotti
Leon Battista Alberti
Galeazzo Alessi
Bartolomeo Ammanati
Donato Bramante
Bramantino
Filippo Brunelleschi
 Michelangelo Buonarroti
Bernardo Buontalenti
Giovanni Antonio Dosio
Giacomo del Duca
Luca Fancelli
Giovanni Maria Falconetto
Aristotile Fioravanti
Domenico Fontana
Girolamo Genga
Pietro di Giacomo Cataneo
Orazio Grassi
Pirro Ligorio
Annibale Lippi
Pietro Lombardo
Martino Longhi the Elder
Onorio Longhi
Luciano Laurana
Annibale Maggi known as Da Bassano
Giuliano da Maiano
Antonio Manetti
Fabio Mangone
Giovanni Mangone
Francesco di Giorgio Martini
Filarete
Michelozzo Michelozzi
Nanni di Baccio Bigio
Andrea Palladio
Alfonso Parigi
Baldassarre Peruzzi
Petrok Maly
Simone del Pollaiolo
Antonio da Ponte
Flaminio Ponzio
Giacomo della Porta
Giorgio da Sebenico
Giulio Romano
Bernardo Rossellino
Antonio da Sangallo the Elder
Antonio da Sangallo the Younger
Giuliano da Sangallo
Jacopo Sansovino
Michele Sanmicheli
Raffaello Santi known as Raphael
Vincenzo Scamozzi
Sebastiano Serlio
Giorgio Vasari
Giacomo Barozzi da Vignola
Leonardo da Vinci
Ascanio Vittozzi

Baroque architects 

Giovan Battista Aleotti
Alessandro Algardi
Gian Lorenzo Bernini
Francesco Borromini
Pietro da Cortona
Giovanni Pietro de Pomis
Cosimo Fanzago
Carlo Fontana
Ferdinando Fuga
Rosario Gagliardi
Alessandro Galilei
Galli Bibiena
Antonio Gherardi
Andrea Giganti
Giovanni Battista Gisleni
Giovanni Francesco Grimaldi
Guarino Guarini
Angelo Italia
Stefano Ittar
Filippo Juvarra
Paolo Labisi
Giulio Lasso
Giacomo Leoni
Baldassarre Longhena
Martino Longhi the Younger
Carlo Maderno
Domenico Martinelli
Ottavio Mascherino
Giorgio Massari
Giovan Battista Montano
Tomasso Napoli
Giovanni Battista Nolli
Andrea Palma
Giovanni Paolo Pannini
Giovanni Battista Piranesi
Filippo Raguzzini
Girolamo Rainaldi
Carlo Rainaldi
Pietro Rosa
Mattia de Rossi
Nicola Sabbatini
Nicola Salvi
Francesco de Sanctis
Ferdinando Sanfelice
Giuseppe Sardi
Vincenzo Sinatra
Giovanni Battista Soria
Alessandro Specchi
Giovanni Battista Vaccarini
Luigi Vanvitelli
Giuseppe Vasi
Bernardo Vittone
Giacomo Zanetti

Neoclassical and eclectic architects 

Ferdinando Albertolli
Giovanni Antonio Antolini
Giovan Battista Filippo Basile
Pietro Camporese the Elder
Pietro Camporese the Younger
Antonio Cano
Alessandro Galilei
Costantino Fiaschetti
Giuseppe Jappelli
Giuseppe Venanzio Marvuglia
Giuseppe Mengoni
Giuseppe Piermarini
Giovanni Battista Piranesi
Leopoldo Pollack
Bartolomeo Rastrelli
Antonio Rinaldi
Carlo Rossi
Giuseppe Sacconi
Faustino Trebbi
Domenico Trezzini
Giacomo Quarenghi
Giuseppe Valadier
Rodolfo Vantini
Antonio Visentini
Giuseppe Zanoia

20th-century architects 

Franco Albini
Archizoom Associati
Gae Aulenti
Pietro Belluschi
Luca Beltrami
Ernesto Basile
Alziro Bergonzo
Cini Boeri
Renato Camus
Achille Castiglioni
Livio Castiglioni
Pier Giacomo Castiglioni
Francesco Cosenza
Raimondo Tommaso D'Aronco
Giancarlo De Carlo
Florestano Di Fausto
Anna Castelli Ferrieri
Emanuele Fiano
Gianfranco Frattini
Ignazio Gardella
Romaldo Giurgola
Giorgio Grassi
Vittorio Gregotti
Franca Helg
Adalberto Libera
Angelo Mangiarotti
Vico Magistretti
Angiolo Mazzoni
Alessandro Mendini
Giovanni Michelucci
Carlo Mollino
Luigi Moretti
Pier Luigi Nervi
Giuseppe Pagano
Marcello Piacentini
Pio Piacentini
Giò Ponti
Ernesto Nathan Rogers partner of architecture firm BBPR
Aldo Rossi
Antonio Sant'Elia
Afra and Tobia Scarpa
Carlo Scarpa
Ettore Sottsass
Studio 65
Superstudio
Manfredo Tafuri
Giuseppe Terragni
Lella Vignelli
Marco Zanuso
Bruno Zevi

Contemporary architects 

Gae Aulenti
Mario Bellini
Cini Boeri
Robby Cantarutti
Massimiliano Fuksas
Vittorio Gregotti
Angelo Mangiarotti
Alessandro Mendini
Renzo Piano
Paolo Portoghesi
Italo Rota
Paolo Soleri
Benedetta Tagliabue
Matteo Thun

See also

 Architecture of Italy
 List of architects
 List of Italians

Italy
Architects